The pear is any of several tree and shrub species of genus Pyrus.

Pear Tree or Peartree may refer to:

England
Pear Tree, Derby, a suburb of Derby, Derbyshire
Peartree railway station, in Derby
Peartree, an electoral ward in Hertfordshire
Peartree Primary School, a school in Hertfordshire
Pear Tree House, an apartment building in London
Peartree Green, an open space in Southampton
Peartree House, a historic building in Southampton
Peartree (ward), an electoral ward in Southampton

Other uses
The Pear Tree, a 1998 Iranian film
Pear Tree Point School, a private elementary school in Darien, Connecticut
Peartree productions, the fictional media organisation headed by television presenter Alan Partridge